Sethu Eyyal (born 6 January 1971) is an Indian director and artist from Eyyal in Thrissur, Kerala. He was an assistant to A. K. Lohithadas. He is well known for his debut film Shyamaragam (History in the 100 years of Indian Cinema, a musical guru flows through 4 generations of music family of KJ Yesudas), which V. Dakshinamoorthy composed the music for the last time.

Career 
He started his film career as an assistant director in the A. K. Lohithadas directed movie  Kasthuri Maan, Chakram, Chakkara Muthu and Nivedyam.

Filmography

As director

As associate director

References

External links 
 

Malayalam film directors
20th-century Indian film directors
21st-century Indian film directors
Film directors from Kerala
1971 births
Living people